Chicago, also known as Four-deal Bridge and Short Bridge, is a form of contract bridge and a variation of rubber bridge in which one or more sets of four deals are played and scored.

Origins and distinctions
Getting its name from the Standard Club of Chicago where it originated in the early 1960s, the game is well suited to club and home play.
While the auction and the play of the hand are the same as in rubber bridge, Chicago has the following unique features:
 A rubber consists of exactly four deals. If a deal is passed out, the same player deals again and the deal passed out does not count as one of the four deals.
 The duration of a set of four deals is likely to be more consistent (typically about twenty minutes) than in rubber bridge where part-score contracts, defeated contracts and three-game rubbers can extend the time of play unpredictably - an attractive feature where limited time is available.
 It enables four to seven players to participate by various methods of partnership rotation after each set of four deals.
 Vulnerability is predetermined for each deal. On the first deal, neither side is vulnerable; on the second and third deals, only the dealer's side is vulnerable; and on the fourth deal, both sides are vulnerable.
 While the basic elements of scoring are similar to rubber bridge, their method of accumulation and recording differ slightly.

Scoring

In modern Chicago scoring, the result of each deal is recorded on a score pad similar to that used in rubber bridge but which has an additional area, usually at the top in the form of an 'X', to indicate which player dealt each hand. Points are awarded as follows:

Contracts points: as in rubber and duplicate bridge, contract points won for each trick up to and including the level of the contract are recorded below the line.

Overtricks: points for each trick taken over the contracted number of tricks are recorded above the line.

Level bonus for game and slams: If a deal results in a game contract, slam or grand slam bid and made, level bonus points are recorded above the line and have the same values as in rubber or duplicate bridge.

Part-score accumulation and level bonus: The part-score treatment differs from that in duplicate bridge and is somewhat akin to that of rubber bridge. A part-score or -scores made previously may be combined with a part-score made in the current deal to complete a game of 100 or more contract points. The level bonus for the game so completed is determined by the vulnerability of the side that completes the game on that deal. No part-score of either side may thereafter be counted  toward game. A part-score on the final deal which does not complete a game receives a level bonus of 100 points; part-scores on the first three deals are not counted toward any level bonus, though.

Doubled and redoubled contracts bid and made receive 'insult' bonuses of 50 and 100 respectively, above the line as in rubber bridge

Undertricks: penalty points for a defeated contract are recorded above the line.

Honor points are recorded above the line as in rubber bridge.

Notes

References

External links
 Chicago or Four-Deal Bridge in the Laws of Rubber Bridge, Appendix 4, pages 41–44.
 How to Keep Score - from the official ACBL website.
 How to Keep Score - Chicago - from the official ACBL website.
 How to Keep Score - Rubber Bridge - from the official ACBL website.

Card games introduced in the 1960s
American card games
Contract bridge
Year of introduction missing